Thomas William Baker (17 August 1905 – 30 March 1975), sometimes known as Billy Baker, was an English professional footballer who played as a goalkeeper in the Football League for Brentford, Southport, Northampton Town and Rochdale.

Career 
A goalkeeper, Baker began his career in his native North East with Northern League clubs Usworth Colliery, Crook Town, Shotton Colliery Welfare and Chilton Colliery Recreation. He later earned a move to the Football League with Southport, for whom he made 65 appearances before departing in 1932.

Baker signed for Third Division South club Brentford in 1932 on a free transfer. Originally signed by manager Harry Curtis as cover for Dave Smith, Baker quickly became Curtis' first-choice goalkeeper and held the position until January 1934, when Jack Clough took over. He made 43 appearances during the Bees' 1932–33 Third Division South title-winning season. Baker left Brentford at the end of the 1933–34 season and made 65 appearances in his two years at Griffin Park.

Baker remained in the Third Division South to sign for Northampton Town and made 13 league appearances during the 1934–35 season. His final league club was Third Division North club Rochdale and he ended his career with North Eastern League club Horden Colliery Welfare.

Personal life 
During his amateur football career, Baker worked as a miner.

Career statistics

Honours 
Brentford
 Football League Third Division South: 1932–33

References

1905 births
1975 deaths
Sportspeople from Seaham
Footballers from County Durham
English footballers
Association football goalkeepers
Usworth Colliery A.F.C. players
Crook Town A.F.C. players
Shotton Colliery Welfare F.C. players
Chilton Colliery Recreation F.C. players
Southport F.C. players
Brentford F.C. players
Northampton Town F.C. players
Rochdale A.F.C. players
Darlington Town F.C. players
Northern Football League players
English Football League players
English miners